Seekamp is a surname of German origin. 

The Seekamp name dates back to November 25, 1481. That Friday, Heinrich Clüver sold a piece of land near Bollen known as the Seekampswerder to the church, who in turn leased the land to two brothers: Hinrich and Brüne. They didn’t have a surname yet. But thanks to the lease, they became known as Hinrich Seekamp and Brüne Seekamp.

Werder are small, cultivated pieces of land, on a river, which become rich and fertile over time through the ebb and flow of river floods. The Seekamp name is formed from German See meaning 'lake', and kamp, a Low German word meaning 'enclosed, fenced, or hedged piece of land', which in turn comes from the Latin word campus meaning 'plain'. So a Seekamp, in the literal meaning of the word, is a lake-field. 

By the early 1700s, descendants of Hinrich Seekamp and his brother had become established families in the surrounding villages: Bollen, Uphusen, Bierden, Mahndorf, Embsen, and the towns of Achim and Arbergen. The Seekamp name had become one of the more common family names in the area.

Notable people with the surname include:

Clara Seekamp (1819–1908), Australian journalist
Frederick Francis Seekamp (born c. 1795), English merchant, mayor of Ipswich 1836–7
Henry Seekamp (1829–1864), Australian journalist 
Nicole Seekamp (born 1992), Australian basketball player

References

Surnames of German origin